This list is a structured list of current operators, for an alphabetically ordered index of current and former operators, see List of bus operators of the United Kingdom

This is a list of current bus and coach operators of the United Kingdom, including public transport, private hire and tour operators.

Large groups
Most bus services in the United Kingdom are run by the Big Five, five large groups of companies which emerged in the 1990s from the consolidation of bus companies privatised in the 1980s.  These groups are all focused on transport.  Some of them also run rail services, express coach services and overseas transport companies.

They are:
 Arriva
  See List of Arriva bus companies

 FirstGroup
  See List of First UK bus companies

 Go-Ahead Group
  See List of Go-Ahead bus companies

 National Express
  See List of National Express UK bus companies

 Stagecoach Group
  See List of Stagecoach UK bus companies

Foreign-owned groups 
A number of large foreign companies have entered the UK bus market.  Their UK bus operations are not yet large, but they are growing.
 Abellio part of Nederlandse Spoorwegen.
 ComfortDelGro
  See ComfortDelGro UK bus companies
 RATPDev
  See List of RATPDev companies
 Transdev
  See List of Transdev UK bus companies

Other bus groups 
 Rotala
 Diamond East Midlands
 Diamond North West
 Diamond South East
 Diamond West Midlands
 Hotel Hoppa
Preston Bus

 Centrebus
 Centrebus
 Chaserider
 D&G Bus
 High Peak Buses (formed in April 2012 between Trentbarton (Dove Holes Depot) and Centrebus)

 Wellglade Group
 Kinchbus
 Notts + Derby
 TM Travel
 Trentbarton

Municipal operators
For a list of the remaining local-government owned bus companies see Municipal bus companies.

London 

In London, a variety of companies run buses under contract to London Buses. They are:
 companies owned by three of the 'Big Five':
 Arriva London
 Go-Ahead London (London Central, London General, Blue Triangle, Docklands Buses)
 Stagecoach London (East London, Selkent, Thameside)
 companies owned by other groups:
 Abellio (Abellio London)
 ComfortDelGro (Metroline)
 RATP (London Sovereign, London United)
 Transit Systems (Tower Transit)
 independent operators:
 Sullivan Buses
 Uno

Northern Ireland

In Northern Ireland most bus services are operated by government-owned Translink through their subsidiaries:
 Metro (formerly Citybus)
 Ulsterbus

Some cross-border services are operated by Bus Éireann.

Independent companies

England

 Bakers Dolphin
 Berrys Coaches
 The Big Lemon
 Bullocks Coaches
 Chalkwell Coaches
 Connect2Wiltshire
 Connexionsbuses
 Cumfybus
 Dales & District
 Delaine Buses
 Ensignbus
 First Choice Bus
 Go-Coach
 Hodge's Coaches
 Hulleys of Baslow
 Johnsons Coach & Bus Travel
 Leisuretime
 Lucketts Travel
 Lynx

 Mayne Coaches
 Minsterley Motors
 Mountain Goat
 NIBS Buses
 Quantock Motor Services
 Redwing Coaches
 Safeguard Coaches
 Skills Coaches
 Southdown PSV
 South West Coaches
 Stephensons of Essex
 Sullivan Buses
 Thames Valley Buses
 Travel Express
 Trustybus
 Uno
 Whippet
 Wilfreda Beehive
 Xelabus
 York Pullman

Scotland
 Bruce's Coaches
 McGill's Bus Services
 McGill's Scotland East
 Xplore Dundee
 West Coast Motors
 Borders Buses
 Glasgow Citybus

Wales 
 Leisuretime
 Edwards Coaches
 Jones Motors (Login)
 Lloyds Coaches
 Richards Brothers
 Tanat Valley Coaches
 Dave Coaches, Barry

Tour bus companies 

 Big Bus Tours
 City Sightseeing
 Golden Tours
 The Original Tour

Express coaches

UK express coach operators include:
 EasyBus
 Green Line Coaches, part of Arriva
 Megabus, part of Stagecoach
 National Express Coaches
 Parks Motor Group
 Scottish Citylink

United Kingdom
Bus operating companies